Lizard Lake may refer to:

 Lizard Lake (Vancouver Island), a lake located on Vancouver Island near Port Alberni
 Lizard Lake (Juan de Fuca, Vancouver Island), a lake on Vancouver Island, in British Columbia, Canada near the town of Port Renfrew
 Lizard Lake (Gunnison County), lake in Gunnison County, Colorado, United States
 Lizard Lake (Hants), lake in West Hants, Nova Scotia, Canada
 Lizard Lake (Halifax), lake in Halifax Regional Municipality, Nova Scotia, Canada